Trigonachras is a genus of 8 species of trees known to science, constituting part of the plant family Sapindaceae.

They grow naturally in the rainforests of the Malay Peninsula, Sumatra, Borneo, the Philippines, Sulawesi and New Guinea.

Species

 Trigonachras acuta  – Sumatra, Malay Peninsula and Borneo
 Trigonachras celebensis  – Sulawesi
 Trigonachras cultrata  – Philippines
 Trigonachras cuspidata  – Philippines
 Trigonachras papuensis  – Papua New Guinea
 Trigonachras sp. A  – Borneo
 Trigonachras sp. B  – Borneo
 Trigonachras sp. C  – Philippines

References

Cited works

 

Sapindaceae genera
Sapindaceae